Ratan Kumar Nehru, or R.K. Nehru, (10 October 1902 – 2 April 1981) was an Indian civil servant and diplomat. He served as the Foreign Secretary, 1952–1955, and later as India's ambassador to China and United Arab Republic (Egypt). During 1960–1963, he was appointed the Secretary-General of the Ministry of External Affairs, a period in which India faced an invasion from China. He retired in 1963, after which the position of Secretary-General was abolished, and the Foreign Secretary role became the head of the Ministry.

References

Bibliography
 

Kashmiri people
1902 births
1981 deaths
Ambassadors of India to China
Nehru–Gandhi family
Ambassadors of India to the United Arab Emirates